Mikhail Yanovitch Makarenko (1931 – 15 March 2007), né Moishe Hershkovich, also Gershkovich, also spelled as Michail Janovitch Makarenko, was a human rights activist, born in Romania to Orthodox Jewish parents, Yankel Hershkovich and Malka Weisman. When he was eight years old he ran away from home to live in Russia. During World War II, from age 10 to 13, he was a "Son of the Regiment", bringing water and food to the troops.

In 1954 he married Lyudmila Makarenko  and took her family name. They had son Sergei and two daughters, Liza and Olga. He actually married and divorced Lyudmila twice.

He spent a total of eleven years in prison for what the Soviet government considered to be dissident activities. His longest imprisonment was a result of a 1970 arrest for exhibiting the work of Russian avant-garde artists. He moved (alone) to the United States of America in 1979 after being exiled by the Soviet government. When asked who were the victims of communism, Makarenko is quoted as saying "Everyone who lived in the 20th century was a victim of communism."

In 1982, Makarenko's testimony was published by the Republican Conference of the U.S. Senate regarding the human cost of building a natural gas pipeline in the Soviet Union. His testimony largely concerned the treatment of the prisoners in Soviet labor camps.

Murder 

Makarenko was murdered at a New Jersey Turnpike rest stop on Thursday, 15 March 2007, by Brian Kuo White (born 1 December 1980). It was reported that White attacked Makarenko with a landscaping rock after Makarenko refused to buy a CD of White's Christian music from him.  On 25 September 2007, White was indicted by a grand jury on counts of murder, possession of a weapon for an unlawful purpose, unlawful possession of a weapon, and eluding arrest.  On 24 June 2008, he was found not guilty of these charges, by reason of legal insanity; he was committed for life plus 10 years to the state Department of Human Services for treatment.

References

External links 
“Remarks by VOCMF Chairman Lee Edwards At the Groundbreaking of the Victims of Communism Memorial”, by Lee Edwards, Victims of Communism Memorial Foundation, 27 September 2006
Testimony of Michail Makarenko, CACC Newsletter, 15 July 1982
“Elderly Man Beaten to Death on N.J. Turnpike” from the Associated Press, 15 March 2007
“Rights Activist Killed at N.J. Rest Stop” by Sandhya Somashekhar, Washington Post, 16 March 2007
“Texas man pleads innocent to fatal beating on turnpike in Mount Laurel” by Mike Mathis, Burlington County Times, 14 January 2008
“Texas man insane, but not guilty, in turnpike killing” by Danielle Camili, Burlington County Times, 24 June 2008

Soviet dissidents
Soviet expellees
Soviet Jews
1931 births
2007 deaths
Soviet emigrants to the United States